The Master and Margaret, is a 1972 Italian-Yugoslav film directed by Aleksandar Petrović, loosely based on Mikhail Bulgakov's 1940 novel The Master and Margarita, although it mainly focuses on the parts of the novel set in 1920s Moscow.

It won the Big Golden Arena for Best Film, with Bata Živojinović picking up the Golden Arena for Best Actor at the 1972 Pula Film Festival, and was selected as the Yugoslav entry for the Best Foreign Language Film at the 45th Academy Awards, but was not accepted as a nominee.

Cast

See also
 List of submissions to the 45th Academy Awards for Best Foreign Language Film
 List of Yugoslav submissions for the Academy Award for Best Foreign Language Film

References

External links

 The Master and Margaret (Aleksandar Petrovic) on the Master & Margarita website

1972 films
Films based on The Master and Margarita
Italian fantasy drama films
Yugoslav fantasy drama films
Serbo-Croatian-language films
1970s Italian-language films
Films directed by Aleksandar Petrović
Serbian fantasy drama films
Films set in Moscow
1970s fantasy films
Films scored by Ennio Morricone
1970s Italian films